Madhya Pradesh Kisan Mazdoor Adivasi Kranti Dal (Madhya Pradesh Peasants Workers Adivasi Revolution Party) is a political party in Madhya Pradesh, India. MPKMAKD was formed as a breakaway from Communist Party of India (Marxist) (CPI(M)) in 2001. In the 2003 Madhya Pradesh legislative assembly elections, MPMKAKD was part of a third front, called 'Madhya Pradesh Jan Mukti Morcha' (Madhya Pradesh People's Liberation Front). The leader of MPMKAKD is Dr. Sunilal.

MPKMAKD participates in the Confederation of Indian Communists and Democratic Socialists.

2001 establishments in Madhya Pradesh
Agrarian parties in India
Communist Party of India (Marxist) breakaway groups
Political parties established in 2001
Political parties in Madhya Pradesh